"Nobahari", (lit."Fresh Spring") is a single by Iranian singer-songwriter Mohsen Namjoo. The poem is by Iranian famous poet Sadi and the whole song is a praise to the Spring. Namjoo dedicated the song to Shahram Nazeri.

The content of the poem
A question for the fresh spring breeze:
What is the garden going through
that makes the bulbul sing
so restlessly.

Compared to your ravishing countenance,
the beauty of a flower pales
Amongst flowers in the garden,
you are like a flower amidst bramble bush.

Oh, treasure of remedies,
look kindly upon the ailing
The cure is in your hands
and you leave us be.

Another life is needed,
for time was spent
in this one
in hopefulness.

References

External links
Listen to the song in Iransing.com
Read the complete poem in Recent.ir

Mohsen Namjoo songs